The Fragrant Companion is a Chinese play by Li Yu, written in 1651. The story is about two girls, Cui Jianyun and Cao Yuhua, who fell for each other after their encounter.

The story is about female homosexuality in a patrilineal society.

Plot
Cui Jianyun, the newly married wife of the renowned scholar Fan Jiefu, went to a temple to burn joss to the gods after her honeymoon. At the temple she meets Cao Yuhua, the daughter of Lord Cao who is two years her junior. Madame Cui became attracted to Cao's extraordinary fragrance and Miss Cao became attracted to Madame Cui's poetic talent. They fall in love and vow to be husband and wife in the next life. In order to live together, Madame Cui persuades her husband to send a matchmaker to Lord Cao's house, asking him to grant her daughter to him as a second wife. Lord Cao flies into a rage at the thought of his daughter becoming a mere concubine to the scholar. He throws out the matchmaker, and leaves at once for the capital with Miss Cao, and orders Fan to be stripped of his title. After numerous twists and turns, Cui Jianyun and Cao Yuhua manage to reunite and in the end her husband was given permission to take them both as wives.

Performances
This story has been on Peking opera stage in 1954, and it is re-compiled into Kun Opera. The latter premiered in Beijing in 2010, to commemorates the 400 anniversary of Li Yu's birthday.

External links
Official website

Qing dynasty plays
Lesbian plays
1651 plays
17th century in LGBT history
Works by Li Yu